The role of the Ambassador and Permanent Representative of France to the United Nations is as the leader of the French delegation to the United Nations in New York and as head of the Permanent Mission of France to the UN. The position has the rank and status of an Ambassador Extraordinary and Plenipotentiary and is also the permanent representative of France in the United Nations Security Council.

The Permanent Representative, currently Nicolas de Rivière, is charged with representing France, both through its permanent seat on the U.N. Security Council and also during plenary meetings of the General Assembly, except in the rare situation in which a more senior officer (such as the Minister for Europe and Foreign Affairs, the Prime Minister or the President) is present.

Office holders

See also
France and the United Nations
Foreign relations of France

References

External links
Permanent Mission of France to the United Nations

Foreign relations of France
Permanent Representatives of France to the United Nations
France
United Nations